William Folorunso Kumuyi (born 6 June 1941) is the founder and General Superintendent of the Deeper Christian Life Ministry situated at Gbagada, Lagos, Nigeria. He is the author of several Christian books and devotionals. William Folorunso Kumuyi celebrated his 80th Birthday on 6 June 2021.

Background
Kumuyi was born into a Christian family in Erin-Ijesa, Ogun State, western part of Nigeria. He completed his secondary school education in 1961 at Mayflower School in Ikenne, Ogun State, from where he proceeded to the University of Ibadan and in 1967 graduated with a first-class honours degree in mathematics where he graduated as overall best graduating student in that year. He subsequently took a post-graduate course in Education at the University of Lagos. He became a born-again Christian on Sunday, April 5th, 1964 at the age of 23.

On his upbringing, Kumuyi was quoted to have said  Kumuyi was influenced by John Wesley, Charles Finney and Charles Spurgeon. His father was a member of the Anglican Church. According to an article in The Sun (Nigeria), Kumuyi is also said to be "a one-time member of the Anglican Church (now Anglican Communion), Celestial Church of Christ, Scripture Union (SU) movement and Apostolic Faith before breaking away to found Deeper Life."

Teaching career
Kumuyi began teaching mathematics in 1962 at Mayflower School, his alma mater. He went on, in the early 1970s, to become a lecturer of mathematics at the University of Lagos. 

In September 2016 a one day program was planned which involves Pastor Kumuyi addressing over 50,000 youths all over Lagos State which would encourage the youths to inculcate in them the highest virtues in youths and stay away from antisocial and push-pull tendencies which causes distractions for the youths especially in this era of social media.

Christian ministry
In 1973, while being a lecturer of mathematics at the University of Lagos, Kumuyi began a Bible study group with 15 students who had come to him for Bible training. This training became the foundation of the Deeper Christian Life Ministry.  In 1975, Kumuyi was expelled from the Apostolic Faith Church for preaching on the baptism of the Holy Spirit. He continued his independent ministry, which in 1982 became the Deeper Life Bible Church. As at 2005, the Christian ministry is said to have over 800,000 affiliates.

Place of worship
The Deeper Christian Life Ministry founded by Kumuyi has the international headquarters of its church in Gbagada, Lagos. The church auditorium at the international headquarters could sit up to 30,000 worshippers; it was described by experts as the fourth largest in the world. The auditorium was inaugurated on 24 April 2018; the Vice President of Nigeria, Yemi Osinbajo, and some other dignitaries attended the inauguration .

Other notable places of worship of his Christian ministry include: the Deeper Life Conference Centre in Ogun State at Kilometer 42, Lagos–Ibadan Expressway and the International Bible Training Centre (IBTC) at Ayobo, Lagos.

Published books
 The Hour of Decision, 1990, 
 How to Know God's Will in Marriage, 1990, 
 Have Compassion on Them, 1991, 
 The Spirit Controlled Family: W.F. Kumuyi, 1996, 
 The Lord's Prayer, 1997, 
 The Truly Liberated Woman, 2000, 
 Supernatural Supply in All Situations, 2009, 
 Daily Manna, Volume 1, 2011, 
 Daily Manna: A Daily Devotional Guide, 2014, 
 Higher Everyday: A Daily Devotional Guide for Successful Youths, 2014, 978-1-46759-810-1  
Kumuyi: Defender of the Faith

Personal life
Kumuyi met Abiodun Olowu in September 1972. She became one of his Bible study students and a member of his fledging Christian ministry. They got married on 13 September 1980 in Lagos, and they have two children, Jeremiah and John. Abiodun Kumuyi died on 11 April 2009.

On 13 October 2010, exactly 18 months after the death of his first wife, Kumuyi married Folashade Adenike Blaize in London. Folashade was the Administrator of the Deeper Life Bible Church, London.

Awards
In 2013, Foreign Policy magazine listed Kumuyi among the "500 most powerful people on the planet".

In 2018, Kumuyi received an honorary PhD from the University of Abuja.

Global Gospel Crusades 
Pastor Dr. W.F. Kumuyi recently started conducting a series of Global Gospel Crusades since April 2021 in Abuja, Nigeria. The June, July, and August 2021 series in Abuja, Calabar and Enugu in Nigeria respectively, were conducted as Global Crusades. There were participants connecting to the Crusade both on social media and dedicated Zoom connections. The August 2021 edition just concluded featured Don Moen ministering along with him. These crusade series was branded Global Crusade with Kumuyi (GCK) in July 2022 with former president of Nigeria and former vice president of Zambia, Olusegun Obasanjo and Nevers Mumba respectively among others in attendance at the brand launch.

Biography 
The first ever biography of Pastor Kumuyi was written and published in 2021 by four authors. The biography titled Kumuyi: Defender of the Faith was forwarded by Pastor Enoch Adeboye.  Nigeria's vice president, Yemi Osibanjo and Lagos state governor BabaJide Sanwo-olu were among prominent world leaders that launched the book.

References

Further reading

1941 births
Living people
Nigerian Christian clergy
Yoruba Christian clergy
People from Osun State
University of Ibadan alumni
Academic staff of the University of Lagos
Nigerian television evangelists
Yoruba academics